Dorsanum is a genus of sea snails, marine gastropod mollusks in the subfamily Dorsaninae  of the family Nassariidae, the Nassa mud snails or dog whelks.

Species
Subgenera :
 Dorsanum (Dorsanum) Gray, 1847
Species within the genus Dorsanum include:
 † Dorsanum estotiensis Lozouet, 1999
 † Dorsanum gaasensis Lozouet, 1999
 † Dorsanum javanum K. Martin, 1931
 † Dorsanum laeve (van Voorthuysen, 1944) 
 † Dorsanum meyni (Beyrich, 1854) 
 Dorsanum miran (Bruguière, 1789)
 † Dorsanum subpolitum (d'Orbigny, 1852) 

Species brought into synonymy 
  Dorsanum (Adinus) H. Adams & A. Adams, 1853 : synonym of Bullia Gray, 1833
 Dorsanum (Adinus) javanum K. Martin, 1931 represented as Dorsanum javanum K. Martin, 1931 (alternate representation)
 Dorsanum belangeri (Kiener, 1834): synonym of Bullia tranquebarica (Röding, 1798)
 Dorsanum granulosum (Lamarck, 1822): synonym of Naytia granulosa (Lamarck, 1822)
 Dorsanum gruveli Dautzenberg, 1910: synonym of Bullia gruveli (Dautzenberg, 1910)
 Dorsanum mauritianum (Gray, 1839): synonym of Bullia mauritiana Gray, 1839
 Dorsanum moniliferum (Kiener, 1834) : synonym of Buccinanops monilifer (Kiener, 1834)
 Dorsanum terebraeforme Dautzenberg, 1913: synonym of Bullia terebraeformis (Dautzenberg, 1912)

References

External links
 Vaught, K.C. (1989). A classification of the living Mollusca. American Malacologists: Melbourne, FL (USA). . XII, 195 pp.
 Gray J.E. (1847). A list of the genera of recent mollusca, their synonyma and types. Proceedings of the Zoological Society of London. 15: 129-219
 Galindo, L. A.; Puillandre, N.; Utge, J.; Lozouet, P.; Bouchet, P. (2016). The phylogeny and systematics of the Nassariidae revisited (Gastropoda, Buccinoidea). Molecular Phylogenetics and Evolution. 99: 337-353

Nassariidae